Ian Fleming Publications is the production company formerly known as both Glidrose Productions Limited and Glidrose Publications Limited, named after its founders John Gliddon and Norman Rose. In 1952, author Ian Fleming bought it after completing his first James Bond novel, Casino Royale; he assigned most of his rights in Casino Royale, and the works which followed it to Glidrose.

In 1956, Ian Fleming hired literary agent Peter Janson-Smith to handle the foreign translation rights in the James Bond novels. He was the literary consultant and chairman of Ian Fleming Publications until 2001. Today, the Fleming family-owned Ian Fleming Publications administers all Fleming's literary works.

Publication history
After Fleming's death in 1964, the estate either commissioned or permitted new Bond works to be published. In 1968, Kingsley Amis published Colonel Sun, under the pseudonym "Robert Markham". The company changed its name from Glidrose Productions to Glidrose Publications. In 1973, Glidrose sanctioned James Bond: The Authorized Biography of 007 by John Pearson. In 1977 and again in 1979, Eon Productions authorized Christopher Wood to write novelisations of his scripts for the Bond films The Spy Who Loved Me and Moonraker.

In 1981 the James Bond book series was revived, with new novels written by John Gardner. After writing 14 Bond books, John Gardner retired in 1996, and Raymond Benson, controversially at first, the first American to write a James Bond novel, replaced him. It was during Benson's six-book run that the company owning the rights to the Bond characters changed names from Glidrose Publications to Ian Fleming Publications; the publisher's new name appeared first in the 1999 book High Time to Kill. Benson stopped writing Bond books in 2002. On what would have been Fleming's 100th birthday—28 May 2008—the novel Devil May Care, appeared. Its author, Sebastian Faulks, was true to Bond's original character and background and provided 'a Flemingesque hero' who drove a battleship grey 1967 T-series Bentley.  Next, Ian Fleming Publications commissioned Jeffery Deaver to write Carte Blanche, which was published in May 2011. In April 2012, the company announced that William Boyd would write the next Bond novel and Jonathan Cape in the UK and HarperCollins in Canada and the US published Solo in 2013.   Anthony Horowitz's Trigger Mortis appeared in September 2015.

Between 2005 and 2008, Ian Fleming Publications has supported the publication of Charlie Higson's five Young Bond novels telling the adventures of a teenage  James Bond in the 1930s. In 2005 the company launched another series of Bond-related spin-off books, The Moneypenny Diaries by Samantha Weinberg, writing as 'Kate Westbrook'.  Young Bond returned in 2013 with Shoot to Kill by Steve Cole.

James Bond books

by Ian Fleming
Casino Royale (1953) — first American paperback title: You Asked For It
Live and Let Die (1954)
Moonraker (1955) — first American paperback title: Too Hot to Handle
Diamonds Are Forever (1956)
From Russia, with Love (1957)
Dr. No (1958)
Goldfinger (1959)
For Your Eyes Only (1960)
Thunderball (1961) — "based on a screen treatment by Kevin McClory, Jack Whittingham and Ian Fleming"
The Spy Who Loved Me (1962)
On Her Majesty's Secret Service (1963)
You Only Live Twice (1964)
The Man with the Golden Gun (1965)
Octopussy and The Living Daylights (1966)

Short stories

by Kingsley Amis
Written by Kingsley Amis under the pseudonym Robert Markham.
Colonel Sun (1968) — last book copyrighted under the Glidrose Productions name

by John Gardner
Licence Renewed (1981) — American title: License Renewed
For Special Services (1982)
Icebreaker (1983)
Role of Honour (1984) — American title: Role of Honor
Nobody Lives for Ever (1986) — American title: Nobody Lives Forever
No Deals, Mr. Bond (1987)
Scorpius (1988)
Win, Lose or Die (1989)
Brokenclaw (1990)
The Man from Barbarossa (1991)
Death is Forever (1992)
Never Send Flowers (1993)
SeaFire (1994)
COLD (1996) — American title: Cold Fall

by Raymond Benson
Zero Minus Ten (1997)
The Facts of Death (1998) - last Bond novel copyrighted under the Glidrose Publications name
High Time to Kill (1999) - first Bond novel copyrighted by Ian Fleming Publications
DoubleShot (2000)
Never Dream of Dying (2001)
The Man with the Red Tattoo (2002)

Short stories

by Sebastian Faulks
The novel by Sebastian Faulks is a one-off adult Bond novel that follows The Man with the Golden Gun in the 1960s. The book was written to celebrate Ian Fleming's centenary and was released on Fleming's birthday, 28 May 2008.
Devil May Care - May 2008

by Jeffery Deaver
The novel by Jeffery Deaver, Carte Blanche, previously known as "Project X", is set in the present era and was published on 28 May 2011.

Carte Blanche - May 2011

by William Boyd

On 11 April 2012 it was announced that William Boyd would write the next James Bond novel, entitled Solo, set at the end of the 1960s. The novel was released in the United Kingdom on 26 September 2013, and in the United States and Canada on 8 October 2013.

Solo - September 2013

by Anthony Horowitz

Trigger Mortis - September 2015
Forever and a Day - May 2018
With a Mind to Kill - May 2022

Novelizations
James Bond, The Spy Who Loved Me (1977) by Christopher Wood
James Bond and Moonraker (1979) by Christopher Wood
Licence to Kill (1989) by John Gardner
GoldenEye (1995) by John Gardner
Tomorrow Never Dies (1997) by Raymond Benson
The World Is Not Enough (1999) by Raymond Benson
Die Another Day (2002) by Raymond Benson

James Bond spinoffs

James Bond, Jr.
Written by the pseudonymous R. D. Mascott, it was the first James Bond related book not written by Ian Fleming to be published after Fleming's death. To this day, Ian Fleming Publications has never disclosed or confirmed the author's identity.

The Adventures of James Bond Junior 003½ (1967)

The Authorized Biography
Written by Fleming's friend and colleague, John Pearson, the book differs from all other Bond novels in that it is a biography told in the first-person by Pearson upon meeting James Bond.

James Bond: The Authorized Biography of 007 (1973) — first book copyrighted under the Glidrose Publications name.

Young Bond

Charlie Higson
Charlie Higson's novels, part of a series called Young Bond, are prequels to Fleming's series.
SilverFin - March 2005
Blood Fever - January 2006
Double or Die - January 2007
Hurricane Gold - September 2007
By Royal Command - September 2008

Short story

Steve Cole
In October 2013 Ian Fleming Publications announced that Steve Cole would continue the series, with his first book 
scheduled to be released in November 2014.

Shoot to Kill - November 2014
Heads You Die - May 2016
Strike Lightning - September 2016
Red Nemesis - May 2017

The Moneypenny Diaries
The Moneypenny Diaries is a trilogy chronicling the life of Miss Moneypenny. The books are written by Samantha Weinberg under the pseudonym Kate Westbrook.

The Moneypenny Diaries: Guardian Angel - October 2005
Secret Servant: The Moneypenny Diaries - November 2006
The Moneypenny Diaries: Final Fling - May 2008

Double O

Kim Sherwood

Other published works
The Diamond Smugglers (1957) — Ian Fleming
Thrilling Cities (1963) — Ian Fleming
Chitty-Chitty-Bang-Bang (1964) — Ian Fleming

Chitty Chitty Bang Bang sequel novels
Three novels were given approval by the Ian Fleming Estate

 Chitty Chitty Bang Bang Flies Again (October 2011) by Frank Cottrell Boyce
 Chitty Chitty Bang Bang and the Race Against Time (September 2012) by Frank Cottrell Boyce
 Chitty Chitty Bang Bang Over the Moon (September 2013) by Frank Cottrell Boyce

Unpublished works
The following are stories known to have been written for Glidrose / Ian Fleming Publications, however, were not published.

 Per Fine Ounce — novel by Geoffrey Jenkins circa 1966.
 "The Heart of Erzulie" — short story by Raymond Benson circa 2001-2002.

References

External links
 Ian Fleming Publications Official Website
 Official Facebook page

 
James Bond lists
Ian Fleming